The year 1700 in music involved some significant events.

Events 
John Eccles is appointed Master of the King's Musick.
William Croft returns to the Chapel Royal, where he had been educated, as a "gentleman organist".
William Corbett becomes director of the New Theatre at Lincoln's Inn Fields.
Johann Sebastian Bach becomes a chorister at St. Michael's Church, Lüneburg.
Tomaso Albinoni is employed as a violinist by Fernando Carlo, Duke of Mantua.
An inventory of musical instruments kept by Prince Ferdinando de Medici provides the first evidence for the existence of the pianoforte.

Published popular music

Classical music 
 Tomaso Giovanni Albinoni – Sinfonie e concerti op. 2
Johann Sebastian Bach 
Prelude and Fugue in D minor, BWV 549a
Christ, der du bist der helle Tag, BWV 766
 John Blow – Amphion Anglicus
Jacques Boyvin – Livre d'orgue II
Sébastien de Brossard – O miraculum!, SdB.006
Antonio Caldara  
La frode della castità
Il trionfo dell'innocenza
 Choice Collection of Ayres for the Harpsichord or Spinnet by John Blow, Jeremiah Clarke, Francis Piggott, John Barrett and William Croft
 Jeremiah Clarke – Prince of Denmark's March (approximate date)
 Arcangelo Corelli – XII Suonati a violino e violone o cimbalo (Op. 5), published in Rome
 John Eccles – The Mad Lover
 Johann Caspar Ferdinand Fischer – Musicalischer Parnassus
 Godfrey Keller 
 The Royal Trumpett-Suite
 8 Trio Sonatas
 Johann Kuhnau – Musicalische Vorstellung einiger biblischer Historien (Biblical sonatas), published in Leipzig
 Johann Sigismund Kusser 
 6 Overture Suites 'Apollon Enjoué'''
 6 Overture Suites 'Festin des Muses' Isabella Leonarda – Motetti a voce sola con istromenti, Op.20
 Alessandro Scarlatti – Il rosignolo se scioglie il volo, H.318

 Opera 
Carlo Agostino Badia – La costanza d'UlisseAndré Campra – HésioneJohn Eccles – The Judgment of ParisAlessandro Scarlatti – EraclesPublications
Jacques Boyvin – Traité abrégé de l'accompagnementJohann Kuhnau – Der musicalische Quack-SalberFriedrich Erhardt Niedt – Musicalische Handleitung Births 
January 14 – Picander, librettist for Johann Sebastian Bach (died 1764)
March 13 – Michel Blavet, flautist (died 1768)
April 2 – Francesca Cuzzoni, opera singer (died 1770)probableSebastian Bodinus, composer (d. 1759)
Jean-Baptiste Masse, cellist and composer (died c.1757)

 Deaths 
January 16 – Antonio Draghi, opera composer (born c.1634)
February 8 – Filippo Acciaiuoli, opera composer, librettist and manager (born 1637)
June 6 – Wespazjan Kochowski, historian, poet and wek (born 1633)probable''
August Kühnel, viola da gamba player and composer (b. 1645)
Monsieur de Sainte-Colombe, violist and composer (born c.1640)

References

 
17th century in music
Music by year